Étienne Jourdan (? – Paris, 9 March 1847), was a 19th-century French playwright, engraver and chansonnier.

Some of his couplets, published in the Paris press, were famous political diatribes.

Works 
1813: Le Boghey renversé, ou Un point de vue de Longchamp, croquis en vaudevilles, with Emmanuel Théaulon and Armand d'Artois
1814: La cocarde blanche, one-act comedy in prose
1834: Artiste et artisan, ou les Deux expositions, one-act comédie-vaudeville, with Ferdinand de Laboullaye
1836: Le Barde, collection of songs
1836: L'Ouverture sans prologue, prologue d'ouverture in 1 act, mingled with vaudevilles, with de Laboullaye

References

Bibliography 
 Joseph Marie Quérard, Félix Bourquelot, Charles Louandre, La littérature française contemporaine. XIXe, 1852, (p. 426)

19th-century French dramatists and playwrights
19th-century French engravers
19th-century French male artists
French chansonniers
Year of birth missing
1847 deaths